Brickendon Estate is a farm estate located in Longford, Tasmania. It is one of the two main ancestral homes (with  Woolmers) of the Archer family, prominent local pioneers and politicians.

Founded in 1824, Brickendon Estate was one of the first (and most successful) farms in the area. Like most Archer estates, it is named after a location in England, in this case, the village of Brickendon in East Hertfordshire.
It consists of a village and manor house, as well as a  working farm. The main manor was built in 1829-1830 in a Georgian style.

It has been lived on and operated by direct descendants of the Archer family since it was established, and is still a working farm.
 
It is listed on the Tasmanian Heritage Register. Along with Woolmers Estate, Brickendon was inscribed onto the Australian National Heritage List in November 2007 as being of outstanding national significance because of their close association with the convict consignment system and in July 2010 included on the World Heritage list as Australian Convict Sites and amongst the world's

" .. best surviving examples of large-scale convict transportation and the colonial expansion of European powers through the presence and labour of convicts"

It is now a popular tourism destination offering farm activities, heritage accommodation, garden tours, and wedding/functions venue.

References

1824 establishments in Australia
Archer family residences
Australian Convict Sites
History of Tasmania
Houses in Tasmania
Museums in Tasmania
Open-air museums in Australia
Tasmanian Heritage Register
Tourist attractions in Tasmania
Convictism in Tasmania